Rhythm City Volume 1: Caught Up is a 20-minute mini movie from the American artist Usher, that aired on New Year's Eve 2004 on Fox. The video followed his 2004 recording Confessions that would sell 1.1 million copies in its first week, the highest ever for an R&B debut. The movie features appearances from Joy Bryant, Ryan Seacrest, Clifton Powell, Naomi Campbell, and Sean Combs. The mini movie featured musical performances from the songs "Seduction," "Caught Up," "Red Light," and "Take Your Hand" from the Confessions album.

Credits
Directed by: Director X
Produced by: Jil Hardin
 Executive Producer: Usher Raymond IV  Jonetta Patton  Samantha Lecca  Ericka Danko
 Cinematographer: Jeff Cutter  Omer Ganhai
 Product Designer: Robb Buono
Written by:  Director X
Starring: Usher
Co-starring: Joy Bryant  Clifton Powell  Naomi Campbell  Sean Combs
 Costumes: Laury Smith
 Choreography: Todd Sams  Anwar Burton
 Dancers

Music videos
 Yeah!
 Burn
 Confessions Part II
 My Boo

Track listing
Credits adapted from the liner notes of Rhythm City Volume One: Caught Up.

Notes
 denotes co-producer

Certifications

References

2000s musical films
2004 short films
2000s English-language films
American musical films